Marta Nieto Martínez (born 31 January 1982) is a Spanish actress.

Biography 
Marta Nieto Martínez was born on 31 January 1982 in Murcia.

Filmography

Film

Television

Awards and nominations

References

External links

1982 births
Living people
Spanish film actresses
Actors from the Region of Murcia
Spanish television actresses
21st-century Spanish actresses